William Alfred Browne (1831-15 August 1904) was a British civil servant. He received his university education at Queens College Galway. In 1853, he was awarded a B.A. from Queens University Ireland.

Browne entered the War Office in 1856 and became a senior clerk in 1878. He became a principal in the Finance Department in 1890 and retired from the War Office in 1897.

The Browne Scholarship in the French and German Languages was created in honour of his wife.

He died in Karlovy Vary on 15 August 1904.

References

1831 births
Year of death missing